Croatia competed at the 2018 Winter Olympics in Pyeongchang, South Korea, from 9 to 25 February 2018, with 19 competitors in four sports.

Competitors
The following is the list of number of competitors participating in the Croatian delegation per sport.

Alpine skiing 

Croatia qualified ten athletes, six male and four female.

Men

Women

Bobsleigh 

Based on their rankings in the 2017–18 Bobsleigh World Cup, Croatia has qualified 2 sleds.

* – Denotes the driver of each sled

Cross-country skiing 

Croatia qualified two male and two female athletes.

Distance

Sprint

Luge 

Croatia has qualified one athlete, signifying the nation's Olympic debut in the sport.

See also
Croatia at the 2018 Summer Youth Olympics

References

Nations at the 2018 Winter Olympics
2018
2018 in Croatian sport